Birte Glang (born 15 April 1980) is a German actress, brand ambassador, and fashion model. She started her career as a series regular on the award winning TV soap opera Unter uns. In 2012, she starred in the German James Bond parody Agent Ranjid rettet die Welt. In 2014, she was booked for a film with the comedian Nick Offerman.

Early life 
The daughter of two teachers is the youngest of three siblings. Glang received her high school diploma (Abitur) from the Willy-Brandt-Gymnasium in Oer-Erkenschwick, Germany. She went on to study law at the Ruhr University Bochum. During her studies, Glang supported herself by working as a model, booking jobs in Milan, Barcelona, Istanbul, Paris, Los Angeles and Vienna. In 2003, she received a Fashion TV Model Award nomination for 'Best Upcoming Model'.

After receiving her law degree in 2006, Glang decided to trade in her lawyer robes for a career as a professional actress. Inspired by roles she booked as a model in TV commercials and music videos, she began taking private acting, speech and voice lessons. She continues to study acting with coaches in Berlin and Los Angeles.

Career

Television 
Glang began her TV career with supporting roles in German TV series and films in 2007. In 2009, this led to a leading role in the popular series Unter uns. She appeared in nearly 300 episodes. During her two-year stint on the show, she also appeared on covers of several fashion and TV magazines.

Glang appeared in TV films highlighted by the 2009 German historical drama Schicksalsjahr, where she co-starred alongside lead actress Maria Furtwängler. In 2010, she appeared in Sony Pictures' tragic-comedy  with German actors Uwe Ochsenknecht and Andrea Sawatzki. The TV film was nominated for the Adolf Grimme Award.

In 2016, Glang starred in Was kostet die Liebe – Ein Großstadtmärchen, the German comedic version of the fairytale Cinderella, which was broadcast on Sat.1.

Film 
In 2011, Glang left her television show for the pursue a film career. Six months later, she was cast for the lead in Constantin Film's action comedy Agent Ranjid rettet die Welt. In the film, she plays the assistant-in-crime of villain Rutger Hauer and the love interest of Kaya Yanar. She also produced and starred in a short film about the need for organ donations. Im Himmel braucht man kein Gepäck ("You Don't Need Luggage in Heaven") was shown as a public service announcement during the preview of feature films in German theaters. It has won several awards, for instance the "Golden Delphin" at the Cannes Cooperate Media & TV Awards 2013, and is in regular television circulation. Since the beginning of 2019, Glang was a recast in the role of Lena Öztürk in the RTL series Alles was zählt, after actress Juliette Greco could no longer continue to embody the role.

Modeling 
In 2006, Glang agreed to a four-year worldwide campaign for Audi Quattro. She appeared in ad campaigns for Pierre Cardin, for Italian clothing line Prima Donna, Oriflame, and German sports nutrition company Multipower Sportsfood. Since 2013, she has an endorsement deal with 'Cellagon' and 'Cellagon Cosmetics'.  In April 2019, Glang was on the cover of Playboy.

Commercials 
In 2000, she was cast for her first television commercial for Esso. Since then, she has appeared in many commercials, like Persil, Bitburger, and Ergo.

Philosophy and philanthropy
Glang is a spokesperson for green living. She hosted Miss Eco 2011 in Hamburg, the "GREENshowroom" in Berlin 2012, and has appeared as a presenter for the Fairtrade Award.

In 2010, she participated in a fundraiser for children-in-need that was broadcast on RTL Television. Since January 2011, she has been an official ambassador for the German Organ Transplantation Foundation (DSO). In 2012, Glang was made a special ambassador for the organization "Für's Leben – Für Organspende" ("For Life – For Organ Donation"), a charity of the DSO.

In the media
Glang has appeared on the covers of FHM, TV Digital, BeStyled, TV Guide, TV 4x7, and TV Direkt. She has also been featured in Elle, Woman, In, OK!, InStyle, Linea Intima, and Viva.

Personal life 

Glang married music producer Moguai in 2008. They live in North Rhine-Westphalia, Berlin and Los Angeles.

Filmography (selection)

Films 
 2012: Agent Ranjid rettet die Welt
 2012: Im Himmel braucht man kein Gepäck ("You Don't Need Luggage in Heaven")

Television 
 2006: Verbotene Liebe (TV series), ARD
 2008: Mannsbilder (comedy show), Sat.1
 2008: Schimanski (TV series), ARD
 2009: Cologne P.D. (TV series), ZDF
 2010: Schicksalsjahre (TV mini series), ZDF
 2010:  (TV film), ZDF
 2010: Alarm für Cobra 11 (TV series), RTL
 2010–2011: Unter uns (TV series), (287 episodes), RTL
 2011: Anna und die Liebe (TV series), Sat.1
 2012: Alarm für Cobra 11 (TV series), RTL
 2012: Cologne P.D. (TV series), ZDF
 2012: Cindy & die jungen Wilden (comedy show), RTL
 2012: Pastewka (comedy series), Sat.1
 2012: Der Ballermann – Ein Bulle auf Mallorca (TV film), RTL
 2013: SOKO Wismar (TV series), ZDF
 2014: Bülent Ceylan & seine Freunde (Comedyshow), RTL
 2015: Stuttgart Homicide (TV series), ZDF
 2016: Was kostet die Liebe? – Ein Großstadtmärchen (TV film), SAT.1
 2017: Alarm für Cobra 11 (TV series), RTL

Commercials 
 2000: Esso
 2005–2006: Sunpoint
 2006: Pearle "Besser sehen"
 2009: Inku
 2009: Persil "Baby Skin"
 2010: Bitburger
 2011: ERGO

Short films/web series 
 2006: "She's so" (Tobias Regner), music clip
 2008: "Hunger", short film
 2008: "Elevator", short film
 2009: "Big Black Crow" (Kai Noll), music clip
 2010: "Dance Like You", dance short film
 2010: "Red Mind", web crime series
 2012: "Im Himmel braucht man kein Gepäck", ("In Heaven You Don't Need Luggage), short film
 2014: "Make Me Better", short film

References

External links 

 
 Official website of Birte Glang
 German Talent Agency of Birte Glang
 English Site Crew United Birte Glang

German film actresses
German female models
German television actresses
1982 births
People from Recklinghausen
Living people
21st-century German actresses